Rinucumab (REGN2176) is a monoclonal antibody designed for the treatment of neovascular age-related macular degeneration.

This drug was developed by Regeneron Pharmaceuticals, Inc.

References 

Monoclonal antibodies